Leonid Svirid (born 2 February 1967) is a Belarusian judoka. He competed at the 1996 Summer Olympics and the 2000 Summer Olympics.

Achievements

References

External links

1967 births
Living people
Belarusian male judoka
Goodwill Games medalists in judo
Olympic judoka of Belarus
Judoka at the 1996 Summer Olympics
Judoka at the 2000 Summer Olympics
Competitors at the 1994 Goodwill Games